David G. Farragut Elementary School, also known as The Farragut School, was a public elementary school located at 10 Fenwood Road, in the Mission Hill district of Boston, Massachusetts, just off of Huntington Avenue. The school was located next to the Fenwood Road trolley-train stop on the "E" branch of the MBTA's Green Line and Brigham and Women's Hospital.

The Farragut School opened in early 1904 and closed in 2011 amidst a restructuring of the Boston Public Schools.  At the time of its closure, the school served students from Kindergarten through Grade 5 and had around 15 teachers overseeing 230 students. The school served an approximate population of more than 25,000 people.

Notes

See also
 David Farragut

External links
 Farragut Elementary School - Boston Public Schools

Elementary schools in Boston
Public elementary schools in Massachusetts
1904 establishments in Massachusetts
Educational institutions established in 1904
2011 disestablishments in Massachusetts
Educational institutions disestablished in 2011